Adrienne Camille Nelson (born 1967) is an American lawyer who is a United States district judge of the United States District Court for the District of Oregon. She previously served as a judge on the Multnomah County Circuit Court from 2006 to 2018 and a justice of the Oregon Supreme Court from 2018 to 2023.

Early life and career
Nelson was born in Kansas City, Missouri, in 1967, and grew up in southwestern Arkansas. She graduated from Gurdon High School in Gurdon, Arkansas, in 1985. Nelson's mother successfully sued her school district to allow Nelson to be valedictorian after her high school initially named a white student with a lower GPA to be valedictorian instead.

Nelson graduated summa cum laude from the University of Arkansas in 1990, with a BA in criminal justice and English. She completed a J.D. degree at the University of Texas School of Law in 1993.

Nelson moved to Portland, Oregon, in 1993, to be closer to her mother, who had previously relocated to the state. Nelson was a contract analyst for an insurance company for two years. She then worked as an attorney in private practice in Portland as a public defender, with Multnomah Defenders Inc, a non-profit public interest law firm, from 1996 to 1999, and for the law firm Bennett, Hartman, Morris & Kaplan LLP from 1999 to 2004. Nelson was a senior attorney in Student Legal and Mediation Services for Portland State University from 2004 to 2006. Nelson served as an adjunct professor at Lewis & Clark Law School from 2002 to 2005.

Nelson has been a member of the American Bar Association House of Delegates and the ABA Commission on Disability Rights. She received the Oregon Women Lawyers (OWLs) Judge Mercedes Deiz Award in 2003, and the Oregon State Bar President's Public Service Award in 2007. She has also served as president of the Multnomah Bar Foundation and president of the Oregon State Bar Foundation Board.

Judicial service

Oregon circuit court 
Governor Ted Kulongoski appointed Nelson as a judge on the Multnomah County Circuit Court in February 2006, to replace Sidney Galton. She was re-elected to a new six-year term in 2012.

Oregon Supreme  Court 
Governor Kate Brown appointed Nelson to the Oregon Supreme Court in January 2018, to replace justice Jack Landau, who retired on December 31, 2017. Nelson's term on the Supreme Court ended in January 2019, but she was elected to a full six year term in November 2018.

Nelson is the first African-American to serve on the Oregon Supreme Court, or on any state appellate court in Oregon.

United States district court 

On July 14, 2022, President Joe Biden nominated Nelson to serve as a United States district judge of the United States District Court for the District of Oregon. President Biden nominated Nelson to the seat vacated by Judge Michael W. Mosman, who assumed senior status on December 27, 2021. On October 12, 2022, a hearing on her nomination was held before the Senate Judiciary Committee. On December 1, 2022, her nomination was reported out of committee by a 12–10 vote. On January 3, 2023, her nomination was returned to the President under Rule XXXI, Paragraph 6 of the United States Senate; she was renominated later the same day. On February 2, 2023, her nomination was reported out of committee by an 11–9 vote. On February 14, 2023, the Senate invoked cloture on her nomination by a 53–44 vote. On February 15, 2023, she was confirmed by a 52–46 vote. She received her judicial commission on February 23, 2023. She is the first African-American woman to serve on the United States District Court for the District of Oregon.

Personal life 
Adrienne C. Nelson High School, named after Nelson, opened in 2021 in the North Clackamas School District.

See also 
 List of African-American federal judges
 List of African-American jurists
 List of Oregon judges

References

External links 

1967 births
Living people
20th-century American lawyers
20th-century American women lawyers
21st-century American judges
21st-century American women judges
African-American history of Oregon
African-American judges
African-American lawyers
African-American women lawyers
Judges of the United States District Court for the District of Oregon
Justices of the Oregon Supreme Court
Lawyers from Portland, Oregon
Lewis & Clark College faculty
People from Kansas City, Missouri
Public defenders
United States district court judges appointed by Joe Biden
University of Arkansas alumni
University of Texas School of Law alumni